This is the list of episodes for the animated television series Martha Speaks. The series aired on PBS Kids from September 1, 2008 to November 18, 2014. Each episode focuses on mainly synonyms and vocabulary, featuring an underlying theme illustrated with (usually informal) keywords, but can occasionally focus on introducing children to different science and other learning concepts, such as the Spanish language through passing mentions, history, and astronomy.

Series overview

Episodes

Season 1 (2008–2009)

Season 2 (2009–2010)
A total of 30 episodes (60 segments) were produced for season 2, with 15 episodes making up season 2 in terms of broadcast order.

Season 3 (2010–2011)
This season is actually the second half of season 2 in terms of production order.

Season 4 (2012–2013)
The fourth season began with "Cora! Cora! Cora!" and "Cora Encore!", both of which guest star Jon Hamm and Jennifer Westfeldt, and concluded with "Martha's Market" and "Bye Bye, Burger Boy". This was the first season to feature guest stars, with others including Jennifer Garner ("Too Many Marthas"), poet laureate Billy Collins ("Billy Collins Speaks"), and astrophysicist Neil deGrasse Tyson ("Eyes on the Skies"). This season is actually season 3 in terms of production order.

Also this season, Christina Crivici has departed as the role as Alice Boxwood and has been replaced by Michelle Creber. Alex Ferris, Madeleine Peters and Cedric Payne (the voices of T.D. Kennelly and Milo Lee, Helen Lorraine, and Truman Oatley) all had noticeable voice maturations, but continued to voice their respective characters.

Season 5 (2013)
This season is actually season 4 in terms of production order.

Also in this season, Alex Ferris has departed from the roles of T.D. Kennelly and Milo Lee (due to noticeable voice maturations from the previous season) and has been replaced with Valin Shinyei and Trevor Lim, respectively. Ashlyn Drummond has also replaced Michelle Creber as the voice of Alice Boxwood. Kenan Thompson guest stars in the episode "Stanley Saves the Day".

Season 6 (2014)
This season is actually season 5 in terms of production order.

Notes
 Six episodes were based on the original books. They were "Martha Speaks", "Martha and Skits", "Martha Blah Blah", "Perfectly Martha", "Martha Walks the Dog", and "Martha Calling".
 "Raiders of the Lost Art" is a parody of Raiders of the Lost Ark.
 "The Martha Code" is a parody of The Da Vinci Code.
 It's the Giant Pumpkin, Martha is the parody of It's the Great Pumpkin, Charlie Brown.
 In the second episode, Martha introduces the show for the first time.
 In the first part of "The Martha Show" episode, there are the parodies of Clifford the Big Red Dog, My Little Pony, and Mister Rogers' Neighborhood.

See also
 Martha Speaks (book)
 Martha Speaks (television series)

References

External links
 List of Martha Speaks episodes and words on the PBS Kids site

Martha Speaks
Martha Speaks